The 2006–07 First League of the Federation of Bosnia and Herzegovina season was the seventh since its establishment.

League standings

External links
RSSSF.org

First League of the Federation of Bosnia and Herzegovina seasons
Bosnia
2006–07 in Bosnia and Herzegovina football